Kids and Company is an American children's TV show that aired on the now-defunct DuMont Television Network on Saturday mornings from September 1, 1951 to May 2, 1953 and was hosted by Johnny Olson (billed as "Johnny Olsen" in the credits) and Ham Fisher. The series was primarily sponsored by Red Goose Shoes.

This was Olson's third series for DuMont, previously hosting the talent show Doorway to Fame and daytime variety series Johnny Olson's Rumpus Room.

Episode status
The season one finale on May 24, 1952 is held by the UCLA Film and Television Archive.  In that episode, Olson stated that the show would return for another season on August 9, 1952 after a ten-week hiatus, marking the anticipated changeover by leading the cast in "Auld Lang Syne," noting that a time had not been decided and that viewers would have to consult their newspapers. Other episodes are held by the Paley Center for Media and the Museum of Broadcast Communications.

See also
List of programs broadcast by the DuMont Television Network
List of surviving DuMont Television Network broadcasts
List of local children's television series
The Magic Cottage (1949-1952), DuMont daytime children's series
All About Baby (1953–55, originated from WGN-TV in Chicago)
Happy's Party (1952–53, originated from WDTV in Pittsburgh)
The Most Important People (1950–51, sponsored by Gerber's Baby Food)
Playroom (1948)

References

Bibliography
 David Weinstein, The Forgotten Network: DuMont and the Birth of American Television (Philadelphia: Temple University Press, 2004) 
 Alex McNeil, Total Television, Fourth edition (New York: Penguin Books, 1980) 
 Tim Brooks and Earle Marsh, The Complete Directory to Prime Time Network TV Shows, Third edition (New York: Ballantine Books, 1964)

External links
 
 DuMont historical website
 Kids and Company finale on the Internet Archive

DuMont Television Network original programming
1951 American television series debuts
1953 American television series endings
1950s American children's television series
Black-and-white American television shows
English-language television shows